Lotu Filipine (born 27 August 1980, in Tofua, Tonga) is rugby union footballer. He plays at flanker. He currently plays with the IBM Big Blue in the Japanese Top League

References

1980 births
Living people
Rugby union locks
Tongan rugby union players
People from Haʻapai
Tonga international rugby union players
Tongan expatriate rugby union players
Expatriate rugby union players in Japan
Tongan expatriate sportspeople in Japan